Contemporary Physics is a peer-reviewed scientific journal publishing introductory articles on important recent developments in physics.
Editorial screening and peer review is carried out by members of the editorial board.

Overview
Contemporary Physics has been published by Taylor & Francis since 1959 and publishes four issues per year. The subjects covered by this journal are: astrophysics, atomic and nuclear physics, chemical physics, computational physics, condensed matter physics, environmental physics, experimental physics, general physics, particle & high energy physics, plasma physics, space science, and theoretical physics.

Aims
The journal publishes introductory review articles on a range of recent developments in physics and intends to be of particular use to undergraduates, teachers and lecturers, and those starting postgraduate studies. Contemporary Physics also contains a major section devoted to standard book reviews and essay reviews which review books in the context of the general aspects of a field which have a wide appeal.

Abstracting and indexing
According to the Thomson Reuters Journal Citation Reports, the journal has a 2020 impact factor of 5.185. Contemporary Physics is abstracted and indexed in Inspec, EBSCO Publishing, Current Contents, Current Mathematical Publications, Mathematical Reviews, SciSearch, and SciBase.

Notable authors 
Contemporary Physics has attracted articles from a number of prominent scientists, including:
 Jim Al-Khalili, OBE
 Subrahmanyan Chandrasekhar, FRS
 Leon Cooper
 Otto Robert Frisch, FRS
 Vitaly Ginzburg, FRS
 Stephen Hawking, CBE, FRS
 Sir Peter Knight, FRS (current Editor-in-Chief) 
 Sir Anthony James Leggett, KBE, FRS
 Sir Nevill Francis Mott, FRS
 Sir John Pendry, FRS FInstP
 Abdus Salam, KBE
 Arthur Leonard Schawlow

References

External links 

Physics journals
Taylor & Francis academic journals